Zone 4 is one of four zones of Marcory, Abidjan, Ivory Coast.

It is known for its Red Light District located in Bietry.  A popular venue for expatriates, Bietry is the major landmark for Western-style food and nightlife in Abidjan. Strip clubs, massage parlours, and brothels are common in that area. Several hundred freelance prostitutes operate in Zone 4 and openly offer their services at street corners, around pubs, hotels, or, more increasingly, inside nightclubs.

Nightlife
 Le Saint-Germain
 Taxi Brousse
 Ebene Night Club
 Jimmy's Night Club
 Parker Place
 Mix Night Club
 Abidjan Nightlife

References

Abidjan
Red-light districts in Ivory Coast